Mycosphere is a peer-reviewed scientific journal which publishes research articles and reviews about fungal biology. 

The journal was founded in 2010 and is the official journal of the Innovative Institute for Plant Health. The journal is published by Mushroom Research Foundation, as of 2022 editor in chief is Ruvishika Shehali Jayawardena from Mae Fah Luang University.

Abstracting and indexing 
The journal is abstracted and indexed in:

 Biological Abstracts
 BIOSIS Previews
 Current Contents
 Google Scholar
 Journal Citation Reports/Science Edition
 Science Citation Index Expanded

According to the Journal Citation Reports, the journal has a 2021 impact factor of 16.525.

References

External links 

 

English-language journals
Mycology journals